The Da Vinci Code is a 2003 mystery thriller novel by Dan Brown. It is Brown's second novel to include the character Robert Langdon: the first was his 2000 novel Angels & Demons.  The Da Vinci Code follows symbologist Robert Langdon and cryptologist Sophie Neveu after a murder in the Louvre Museum in Paris causes them to become involved in a battle between the Priory of Sion and Opus Dei over the possibility of Jesus Christ and Mary Magdalene having had a child together.

The novel explores an alternative religious history, whose central plot point is that the Merovingian kings of France were descended from the bloodline of Jesus Christ and Mary Magdalene, ideas derived from Clive Prince's The Templar Revelation (1997) and books by Margaret Starbird. The book also refers to The Holy Blood and the Holy Grail (1982) though Dan Brown has stated that it was not used as research material.

The Da Vinci Code provoked a popular interest in speculation concerning the Holy Grail legend and Mary Magdalene's role in the history of Christianity. The book has, however, been extensively denounced by many Christian denominations as an attack on the Catholic Church, and also consistently criticized by scholars for its historical and scientific inaccuracies. The novel nonetheless became a massive worldwide bestseller that sold 80 million copies  and has been translated into 44 languages. In November 2004, Random House published a Special Illustrated Edition with 160 illustrations. In 2006, a film adaptation was released by Columbia Pictures.

Plot
Louvre curator and Priory of Sion grand master Jacques Saunière is fatally shot one night at the museum by an albino Catholic monk named Silas, who is working on behalf of someone he knows only as the Teacher, who wishes to discover the location of the "keystone," an item crucial in the search for the Holy Grail.

After Saunière's body is discovered in the pose of the Vitruvian Man by Leonardo da Vinci, the police summon Harvard professor Robert Langdon, who is in town on business. Police captain Bezu Fache tells him that he was summoned to help the police decode the cryptic message Saunière left during the final minutes of his life. The message includes a Fibonacci sequence out of order and an anagram 'O, draconian devil Oh, lame saint'.

Langdon explains to Fache that the pentacle Saunière drew on his chest in his own blood represents an allusion to the goddess and not devil worship, as Fache believes.

Sophie Neveu, a police cryptographer, secretly explains to Langdon that she is Saunière's estranged granddaughter and that Fache thinks Langdon is the murderer because the last line in her grandfather's message, which was meant for Neveu, said "P.S. Find Robert Langdon," which Fache had erased prior to Langdon's arrival.  However, "P.S." does not refer to "postscript", but rather to Sophie — the nickname given to her by her grandfather was "Princess Sophie". She understands that her grandfather intended Langdon to decipher the code, which leads to Leonardo da Vinci's Mona Lisa, which in turn leads to his painting Madonna of the Rocks. They find a pendant that holds the address of the Paris branch of the Depository Bank of Zurich.

Neveu and Langdon escape from the police and visit the bank. In the safe deposit box, they find a box containing the keystone: a cryptex, a cylindrical, hand-held vault with five concentric, rotating dials labeled with letters. When these are lined up correctly, they unlock the device. If the cryptex is forced open, an enclosed vial of vinegar breaks and dissolves the message inside the cryptex, which was written on papyrus. The box containing the cryptex contains clues to its password.

Langdon and Neveu take the keystone to the home of Langdon's friend, Sir Leigh Teabing, an expert on the Holy Grail, the legend of which is heavily connected to the Priory. There, Teabing explains that the Grail is not a cup, but connected to Mary Magdalene, and that she was Jesus Christ's wife and is the person to his right in The Last Supper.

The trio then flee the country on Teabing's private plane, on which they conclude that the proper combination of letters spells out Neveu's given name, Sofia. Opening the cryptex, they discover a smaller cryptex inside it, along with another riddle that ultimately leads the group to the tomb of Isaac Newton in Westminster Abbey.

During the flight to Britain, Neveu reveals the source of her estrangement from her grandfather ten years earlier: arriving home unexpectedly from university, Neveu secretly witnessed a spring fertility rite conducted in the secret basement of her grandfather's country estate. From her hiding place, she was shocked to see her grandfather with a woman at the center of a ritual attended by men and women who were wearing masks and chanting praise to the goddess. She fled the house and broke off all contact with Saunière. Langdon explains that what she witnessed was an ancient ceremony known as hieros gamos or "sacred marriage."

By the time they arrive at Westminster Abbey, Teabing is revealed to be the Teacher for whom Silas is working. Teabing wishes to use the Holy Grail, which he believes is a series of documents establishing that Jesus Christ married Mary Magdalene and fathered children, in order to ruin the Vatican. He compels Langdon at gunpoint to solve the second cryptex's password, which Langdon realizes is "apple." Langdon secretly opens the cryptex and removes its contents before tossing the empty cryptex in the air.

Teabing is arrested by Fache, who by now realizes that Langdon is innocent. Bishop Aringarosa, head of religious sect Opus Dei and Silas' mentor, realizing that Silas has been used to murder innocent people, rushes to help the police find him. When the police find Silas hiding in an Opus Dei Center, Silas assumes that they are there to kill him and he rushes out, accidentally shooting Bishop Aringarosa. Bishop Aringarosa survives but is informed that Silas was found dead later from a gunshot wound.

The final message inside the second keystone leads Neveu and Langdon to Rosslyn Chapel, whose docent turns out to be Neveu's long-lost brother, who Neveu had been told died as a child in the car accident that killed her parents. The guardian of Rosslyn Chapel, Marie Chauvel Saint Clair, is Neveu's long-lost grandmother. It is revealed that Neveu and her brother are descendants of Mary Magdalene. The Priory of Sion hid her identity to protect her from possible threats to her life.

The real meaning of the last message is that the Grail is buried beneath the small pyramid directly below the La Pyramide Inversée, the inverted glass pyramid of the Louvre. It also lies beneath the "Rose Line," an allusion to "Rosslyn." Langdon figures out this final piece to the puzzle; he follows the Rose Line (prime meridian) to La Pyramide Inversée, where he kneels to pray before the hidden sarcophagus of Mary Magdalene, as the Templar knights did before.

Characters

Robert Langdon: A professor of symbology at Harvard University and the protagonist of the novel.
Jacques Saunière: The grandmaster of the Priory of Sion, Curator of Louvre Museum.
Sophie Neveu: A cryptologist of the French police and granddaughter of Saunière.
Bezu Fache: A member of Opus Dei and a French police captain.
Silas / The Monk: A member of Opus Dei who murders Saunière and the secondary antagonist of the novel.
Manuel Aringarosa: A bishop of the Vatican and member of Opus Dei.
Sister Sandrine: A Seneschal of the Priory of Sion and nun of St. Sulpice.

André Vernet: A guard of Zurich bank.
Sir Leigh Teabing / The Teacher: A Grail scholar and British expatriate living in Paris, and the main antagonist of the novel.
Rémy Legaludec: A servant who assists Teabing.
Jérôme Collet: A French police lieutenant and Fache's deputy.
Marie Chauvel Saint-Clair: Sophie's grandmother.

Reaction

Sales
The Da Vinci Code was a major success in 2003 and was outsold only by J. K. Rowling's Harry Potter and the Order of the Phoenix.

It sold 80 million copies worldwide.

Historical inaccuracies

The book generated criticism when it was first published for the inaccurate description of core aspects of Christianity and descriptions of European art, history, and architecture. The book has received mostly negative reviews from Catholic and other Christian communities.

Many critics took issue with the level of research Brown did when writing the story. The New York Times writer Laura Miller characterized the novel as "based on a notorious hoax", "rank nonsense", and "bogus", saying the book is heavily based on the fabrications of Pierre Plantard, who is asserted to have created the Priory of Sion in 1956.

Critics accuse Brown of distorting and fabricating history. For example, theological author Marcia Ford wrote:

Richard Abanes wrote:

The book opens with the claim by Dan Brown that "The Priory of Sion—a French secret society founded in 1099—is a real organization". This assertion is broadly disputed; the Priory of Sion is generally regarded as a hoax created in 1956 by Pierre Plantard. The author also claims that "all descriptions of artwork, architecture, documents… and secret rituals in this novel are accurate", but this claim is disputed by numerous academic scholars and experts in numerous areas.

Dan Brown himself addresses the idea of some of the more controversial aspects being fact on his website, stating that the "FACT" page at the beginning of the novel mentions only "documents, rituals, organization, artwork and architecture", but not any of the ancient theories discussed by fictional characters, stating that "Interpreting those ideas is left to the reader". Brown also says, "It is my belief that some of the theories discussed by these characters may have merit" and "the secret behind The Da Vinci Code was too well documented and significant for me to dismiss."

In 2003, while promoting the novel, Brown was asked in interviews what parts of the history in his novel actually happened. He replied "Absolutely all of it." In a 2003 interview with CNN's Martin Savidge he was again asked how much of the historical background was true. He replied, "99% is true… the background is all true".

Asked by Elizabeth Vargas in an ABC News special if the book would have been different if he had written it as non-fiction he replied, "I don't think it would have."

In 2005, UK TV personality Tony Robinson edited and narrated a detailed rebuttal of the main arguments of Dan Brown and those of Michael Baigent, Richard Leigh and Henry Lincoln, who authored the book Holy Blood, Holy Grail, in the program The Real Da Vinci Code, shown on British TV Channel 4. The program featured lengthy interviews with many of the main protagonists cited by Brown as "absolute fact" in The Da Vinci Code.

Arnaud de Sède, son of Gérard de Sède, stated categorically that his father and Plantard had made up the existence of the Prieuré de Sion, the cornerstone of the Jesus bloodline theory: "frankly, it was piffle", noting that the concept of a descendant of Jesus was also an element of the 1999 Kevin Smith film Dogma.

The earliest appearance of this theory is due to the 13th-century Cistercian monk and chronicler Peter of Vaux de Cernay who reported that Cathars believed that the 'evil' and 'earthly' Jesus Christ had a relationship with Mary Magdalene, described as his concubine (and that the 'good Christ' was incorporeal and existed spiritually in the body of Paul). The program The Real Da Vinci Code also cast doubt on the Rosslyn Chapel association with the Grail and on other related stories, such as the alleged landing of Mary Magdalene in France.

According to The Da Vinci Code, the Roman Emperor Constantine I suppressed Gnosticism because it portrayed Jesus as purely human. The novel's argument is as follows: Constantine wanted Christianity to act as a unifying religion for the Roman Empire. He thought Christianity would appeal to pagans only if it featured a demigod similar to pagan heroes. According to the Gnostic Gospels, Jesus was merely a human prophet, not a demigod. Therefore, to change Jesus' image, Constantine destroyed the Gnostic Gospels and promoted the gospels of Matthew, Mark, Luke, and John, which portray Jesus as divine or semi-divine.

But Gnosticism did not portray Jesus as merely human. All Gnostic writings depict Christ as purely divine, his human body being a mere illusion (see Docetism). Gnostic sects saw Christ this way because they regarded matter as evil, and therefore believed that a divine spirit would never have taken on a material body.

Literary criticism
The book received both positive and negative reviews from critics, and it has been the subject of negative appraisals concerning its portrayal of history. Its writing and historical accuracy were reviewed negatively by The New Yorker, Salon.com, and Maclean's.

Janet Maslin of The New York Times said that one word "concisely conveys the kind of extreme enthusiasm with which this riddle-filled, code-breaking, exhilaratingly brainy thriller can be recommended. That word is wow. The author is Dan Brown (a name you will want to remember). In this gleefully erudite suspense novel, Mr. Brown takes the format he has been developing through three earlier novels and fine-tunes it to blockbuster perfection."

David Lazarus of The San Francisco Chronicle said, "This story has so many twists—all satisfying, most unexpected—that it would be a sin to reveal too much of the plot in advance. Let's just say that if this novel doesn't get your pulse racing, you need to check your meds."

While interviewing Umberto Eco in a 2008 issue of The Paris Review, Lila Azam Zanganeh characterized The Da Vinci Code as "a bizarre little offshoot" of Eco's novel, Foucault's Pendulum. In response, Eco remarked, "Dan Brown is a character from Foucault's Pendulum! I invented him. He shares my characters' fascinations—the world conspiracy of Rosicrucians, Masons, and Jesuits. The role of the Knights Templar. The hermetic secret. The principle that everything is connected. I suspect Dan Brown might not even exist."

The book appeared at number 43 on a 2010 list of 101 best books ever written, which was derived from a survey of more than 15,000 Australian readers.

Salman Rushdie said during a lecture, "Do not start me on The Da Vinci Code. A novel so bad that it gives bad novels a bad name."

Stephen Fry has referred to Brown's writings as "complete loose stool-water" and "arse gravy of the worst kind". In a live chat on June 14, 2006, he clarified, "I just loathe all those book[s] about the Holy Grail and Masons and Catholic conspiracies and all that botty-dribble. I mean, there's so much more that's interesting and exciting in art and in history. It plays to the worst and laziest in humanity, the desire to think the worst of the past and the desire to feel superior to it in some fatuous way."

Stephen King likened Dan Brown's work to "Jokes for the John", calling such literature the "intellectual equivalent of Kraft Macaroni and Cheese". The New York Times, while reviewing the movie based on the book, called the book "Dan Brown's best-selling primer on how not to write an English sentence". The New Yorker reviewer Anthony Lane refers to it as "unmitigated junk" and decries "the crumbling coarseness of the style". Linguist Geoffrey Pullum and others posted several entries critical of Dan Brown's writing, at Language Log, calling Brown one of the "worst prose stylists in the history of literature" and saying Brown's "writing is not just bad; it is staggeringly, clumsily, thoughtlessly, almost ingeniously bad". Roger Ebert described it as a "potboiler written with little grace and style", although he said it did "supply an intriguing plot". In his review of the film National Treasure, whose plot also involves ancient conspiracies and treasure hunts, he wrote: "I should read a potboiler like The Da Vinci Code every once in a while, just to remind myself that life is too short to read books like The Da Vinci Code."

Lawsuits
Author Lewis Perdue alleged that Brown plagiarized from two of his novels, The Da Vinci Legacy, originally published in 1983, and Daughter of God, originally published in 2000. He sought to block distribution of the book and film. However, Judge George Daniels of the US District Court in New York ruled against Perdue in 2005, saying that "A reasonable average lay observer would not conclude that The Da Vinci Code is substantially similar to Daughter of God" and that "Any slightly similar elements are on the level of generalized or otherwise unprotectable ideas." Perdue appealed; the 2nd US Circuit Court of Appeals upheld the original decision, saying Mr. Perdue's arguments were "without merit".

In early 2006, Michael Baigent and Richard Leigh filed suit against Brown's publisher, Random House. They alleged that significant portions of The Da Vinci Code were plagiarized from The Holy Blood and the Holy Grail, violating their copyright. Brown confirmed during the court case that he named the principal Grail expert of his story Leigh Teabing, an anagram of "Baigent Leigh", after the two plaintiffs. In reply to the suggestion that Henry Lincoln was also referred to in the book, since he has medical problems resulting in a severe limp, like the character of Leigh Teabing, Brown stated he was unaware of Lincoln's illness and the correspondence was a coincidence. Since Baigent and Leigh had presented their conclusions as historical research, not as fiction, Mr Justice Peter Smith, who presided over the trial, deemed that a novelist must be free to use these ideas in a fictional context, and ruled against Baigent and Leigh. Smith also hid his own secret code in his written judgment, in the form of seemingly random italicized letters in the 71-page document, which apparently spell out a message. Smith indicated he would confirm the code if someone broke it. After losing before the High Court on July 12, 2006, Baigent and Leigh appealed to the Court of Appeal, unsuccessfully.

In April 2006 Mikhail Anikin, a Russian scientist and art historian working as a senior researcher at the Hermitage Museum in St Petersburg, stated the intention to bring a lawsuit against Dan Brown, maintaining that he was the one who coined the phrase used as the book's title and one of the ideas regarding the Mona Lisa used in its plot. Anikin interprets the Mona Lisa to be a Christian allegory consisting of two images, one of Jesus Christ that comprises the image's right half, and one of the Virgin Mary that forms its left half. According to Anikin, he expressed this idea to a group of experts from the Museum of Houston during a 1988 René Magritte exhibit at the Hermitage, and when one of the Americans requested permission to pass it along to a friend Anikin granted the request on condition that he be credited in any book using his interpretation. Anikin eventually compiled his research into Leonardo da Vinci or Theology on Canvas, a book published in 2000, but The Da Vinci Code, published three years later, makes no mention of Anikin and instead asserts that the idea in question is a "well-known opinion of a number of scientists."

Brown has been sued twice in U.S. Federal courts by the author Jack Dunn who claims Brown copied a huge part of his book The Vatican Boys to write The Da Vinci Code and Angels & Demons. Both lawsuits were not allowed to go to a jury trial. In 2017, in London, another claim was begun against Brown by Jack Dunn who claimed that justice was not served in the U.S. lawsuits.

Possibly the largest reaction occurred in Kolkata, India, where a group of around 25 protesters "stormed" Crossword bookstore, pulled copies of the book from the racks, and threw them to the ground. On the same day, a group of 50–60 protesters successfully made the Oxford Bookstore on Park Street decide to stop selling the book "until the controversy sparked by the film's release was resolved". Thus in 2006, seven Indian states (Nagaland, Punjab, Goa, Tamil Nadu, Andhra Pradesh) banned the release or exhibition of the Hollywood movie The Da Vinci Code (as well as the book). Later, two states, Tamil Nadu and Andhra Pradesh, lifted the ban under high court order.

Release details
The book has been translated into over 44 languages, primarily hardcover. Major English-language (hardcover) editions include:
 .
  (as of January 2006, has sold 576,000 copies).
 .
 .
 .
 , 5 million copies.
 , released 200,000 copies.
 , the day of the film's release. Including film stills, behind-the-scenes photos and the full script. 25,000 copies of the hardcover, and 200,000 of the paperback version.

Film

Columbia Pictures adapted the novel to film, with a screenplay written by Akiva Goldsman, and Academy Award winner Ron Howard directing. The film was released on May 19, 2006, and stars Tom Hanks as Robert Langdon, Audrey Tautou as Sophie Neveu, and Sir Ian McKellen as Sir Leigh Teabing. During its opening weekend, moviegoers spent an estimated $77 million in America, and $224 million worldwide.

The movie received mixed reviews. Roger Ebert in its review wrote that "Ron Howard is a better filmmaker than Dan Brown is a novelist; he follows Brown's formula (exotic location, startling revelation, desperate chase scene, repeat as needed) and elevates it into a superior entertainment, with Tom Hanks as a theo-intellectual Indiana Jones... it's involving, intriguing and constantly seems on the edge of startling revelations."

The film received two sequels: Angels & Demons, released in 2009, and Inferno, released in 2016. Ron Howard returned to direct both sequels.

See also

 Bible conspiracy theory
 Christian feminism
 Constantinian shift
 Desposyni
 False title
 List of best-selling books
 Smithy code
 The Jesus Scroll
 Mona Lisa replicas and reinterpretations
 The Rozabal Line
 The Doomsday Conspiracy

References

Further reading
 Bock, Darrell L. Breaking the da Vinci code: Answers to the questions everyone's asking (Thomas Nelson, 2004).
 Ehrman, Bart D. Truth and fiction in The Da Vinci Code: a historian reveals what we really know about Jesus, Mary Magdalene, and Constantine (Oxford University Press, 2004).
 Easley, Michael J., and John Ankerberg. The Da Vinci Code Controversy: 10 Facts You Should Know (Moody Publishers, 2006).
 Gale, Cengage Learning. A Study Guide for Dan Brown's The Da Vinci Code (Gale, Cengage Learning, 2015).
 Hawel, Zeineb Sami. "Did Dan Brown Break or Repair the Taboos in the Da Vinci Code? An Analytical Study of His Dialectical Style." International Journal of Linguistics and Literature (IJLL) 7.4: 5-24. online
 Kennedy, Tammie M. "Mary Magdalene and the Politics of Public Memory: Interrogating" The Da Vinci Code"." Feminist Formations (2012): 120-139. online
 Mexal, Stephen J. "Realism, Narrative History, and the Production of the Bestseller: The Da Vinci Code and the Virtual Public Sphere." Journal of Popular Culture 44.5 (2011): 1085–1101. online
 Newheiser, Anna-Kaisa, Miguel Farias, and Nicole Tausch. "The functional nature of conspiracy beliefs: Examining the underpinnings of belief in the Da Vinci Code conspiracy." Personality and Individual Differences 51.8 (2011): 1007–1011. online
 Olson, Carl E., and Sandra Miesel. The da Vinci hoax: Exposing the errors in The da Vinci code (Ignatius Press, 2004).
 Propp, William H. C. "Is The Da Vinci Code True?." Journal of Religion and Popular Culture 25.1 (2013): 34–48.
 Pullum, Geoffrey K. "The Dan Brown code." (2004)
 Schneider-Mayerson, Matthew. "The Dan Brown phenomenon: conspiracism in post-9/11 popular fiction." Radical History Review 2011.111 (2011): 194–201. online
 Walsh, Richard G. "Passover Plots: From Modern Fictions to Mark and Back Again." Postscripts: The Journal of Sacred Texts, Cultural Histories, and Contemporary Contexts 3.2-3 (2007): 201–222. online

External links

 
 
 
 
 

 
2003 American novels
American detective novels
Albinism in popular culture
American mystery novels
American thriller novels
Bible conspiracy theories
British Book Award-winning works
Novels about cryptography
Holy Grail in fiction
Novels about museums
Novels by Dan Brown
Opus Dei
Sequel novels
Novels involved in plagiarism controversies
Doubleday (publisher) books
Anti-Catholic publications
Mona Lisa
American novels adapted into films
Novels adapted into video games
Censored books
Denial of the crucifixion of Jesus
Religious controversies in literature
Cultural depictions of Mary Magdalene
Novels set in one day